Humphrey Pickard (10 June 1813 – 28 February 1890) was a Canadian Methodist minister, educator, and journalist. He was the first president from 1862 to 1869 of Mount Allison Wesleyan College (later known as Mount Allison University).

Born in Fredericton, New Brunswick, Pickard attended Wilbraham Wesleyan Academy from 1829 to 1831. He attended one year at Wesleyan University in 1831 before returning to Fredericton to become a businessman. In 1835, he became a Methodist minister and returned to Wesleyan University in 1837 and graduated in 1839.

From 1869 to 1873, Pickard was editor of the Wesleyan, a Methodist newspaper in Halifax. "Wesleyan University conferred a DD on him in 1857."

References

1813 births
1890 deaths
Canadian Methodist ministers
Canadian university and college chief executives
People from Fredericton
Wesleyan University alumni
Wilbraham & Monson Academy alumni
19th-century Methodists